Redditch Borough Council Elections were held on Thursday 2 May 1996. Nine Council wards were up for election.

Results

References

1996
1996 English local elections
1990s in Worcestershire